Catocala hyperconnexa is a moth in the family Erebidae first described by Shigero Sugi in 1965. It is found in Japan.

References

hyperconnexa
Moths described in 1965
Moths of Japan